Etimasu cosmipes is a species of beetle in the family Cerambycidae, the only species in the genus Etimasu.

References

Rhinotragini
Monotypic Cerambycidae genera